Thomas Holdup Stevens Jr. (27 May 1819 – 15 May 1896) was an admiral of the United States Navy who fought in the American Civil War.

Early life and commission
Stevens, the son of Captain Thomas Holdup Stevens (1795–1841) was born in Middletown, Connecticut, on 27 May 1819. After three months leave, from April to June 1840, he served at the Depot of Charts and Instruments. Following a tour at the Washington Navy Yard and coast survey duty at New York, he attended the Naval School at Philadelphia, stood his examination on 2 June 1842, and was warranted a passed midshipman on 2 July. Between 1842 and 1855, Stevens served at various posts ashore, among which were two tours on coast survey duty, one tour as acting master of  during her construction and 30 months as storekeeper in Honolulu, Hawaii. In September 1855, Lt. Stevens was dropped from the Navy under an Act of 28 February 1855.

American Civil War
On 29 January 1858, he was recommissioned a lieutenant. In November, he fought at Port Royal, South Carolina and helped capture Forts Beauregard and Walker. Between New Year's Day  and 4 March 1862, he blockaded the coast of Florida and helped to capture Fort Clinch, and the towns of Fernandina and St. Mary's. He also commanded the first expedition up the St. Johns River in March and April.

He commanded her in operations supporting General George McClellan's advance during the Peninsula Campaign in May 1862. On 15 July, he was promoted to commander and, from 9 May to 6 September, commanded .

On 18 June 1863, Commander Stevens was detached from Sonoma at New York and, on 3 August, he was directed to report to the South Atlantic Blockading Squadron. Rear Admiral John A. Dahlgren, the squadron commander, placed Stevens in command of the ironclad  and, between 21 August and 4 November, he led attacks on the defenses of Charleston harbor. By 1 July 1864, Comdr. Stevens commanded , operating with the West Gulf Blockading Squadron. There, he took part in operations before Mobile, until 3 August. Admiral David Farragut then ordered him to command the double-turreted monitor  which he led in attacks on Fort Powell and in the Battle of Mobile Bay on the 5th. He resumed command of Oneida on 18 August and retained it through the end of the war and until August 1865.

Flag officer
In 1866, Comdr. Stevens was appointed lighthouse inspector for the 11th Treasury District. During that assignment, he was promoted to captain. He was detached from duty as lighthouse inspector on 14 September and, on 26 July 1870, was ordered to command  in the European Squadron. Stevens was promoted to commodore on 19 February 1873, to date from 20 November 1872, and was assigned to the Norfolk Navy Yard—first as commanding officer, then on a special assignment related to Norfolk harbor.

In 1879, he was promoted to rear admiral to date from 19 January 1880, and on 19 August 1880, he was ordered to the command of the Pacific Squadron. He relinquished that command on 16 May 1881, pending his retirement on 27 May. 

Stevens was a member of the Military Order of the Loyal Legion of the United States as well as an honorary companion of the Pennsylvania Commandery of the Military Order of Foreign Wars.

Rear Admiral Stevens died at Rockville, Maryland, on 15 May 1896 and was buried at Arlington National Cemetery.

Legacy
In 1942, the destroyer  was named in honor of both R.Adm. Stevens and his father, Capt. Thomas H. Stevens.

References

 

1819 births
1896 deaths
United States Navy admirals
People of Connecticut in the American Civil War
Burials at Arlington National Cemetery
Military personnel from Connecticut